Ereis anthriboides is a species of beetle in the family Cerambycidae. It was described by Francis Polkinghorne Pascoe in 1857. It is known from Sumatra and Malaysia.

Subspecies
 Ereis anthriboides annamensis Breuning, 1967
 Ereis anthriboides anthriboides (Pascoe, 1857)

References

Mesosini
Beetles described in 1857